The Bharatiya Janata Party (BJP) is one of the two major political parties in India and has been the ruling party since the 16th Lok Sabha. It was seeking re-election in the 2019 parliamentary election as the leading party of the National Democratic Alliance, with Narendra Modi as its Prime Ministerial candidate and party president Amit Shah as the campaign chief.

Background
The campaign follows the successful campaign in 2014, where the BJP won a majority of the seats in the Lok Sabha.

On 26 December 2018, Party President Amit Shah announced the leadership teams for the BJP's campaign in seventeen states.

The BJP released its manifesto, titled Sankalp Patra on 8 April.

Results

Main Bhi Chowkidar

Modi responded to Rahul Gandhi's Chowkidar Chor Hai jibe by launching a campaign with the slogan "Main bhi chowkidar" for his supporters, inferring that everyone is a fighter against corruption and social evils. Modi even changed the name of his official Twitter handle titled 'Narendra Modi' to 'Chowkidar Narendra Modi'.

In a coordinated campaign, ministers, party president Amit Shah and other BJP leaders such as Piyush Goyal changed their Twitter profile names by adding a prefix "Chowkidar". Many supporters of BJP also changed their names accordingly. Modi addressed a large group of watchmen on audio link as part of the campaign.

Leadership
BJP's president during the election campaign was Amit Shah.

Alliance
BJP had formed an alliance with other parties to form NDA.

Issues

Ram temple 

The BJP supports the building of a Ram temple on the disputed land in Ayodhya, Uttar Pradesh. It was seen that the party campaigned heavily on the issue during the election. It was viewed that prime minister Narendra Modi and the Uttar Pradesh chief minister Yogi Adityanath were pushing for the construction of the Ram temple to garner the majority Hindu vote.

Manifesto
BJP constituted the manifesto committee on 6 January 2019, to be headed by Rajnath Singh. 15 sub-committees were planned to be formed under the main committee to form the manifesto. Other key members of the committee were Arun Jaitley, Ravi Shankar Prasad, Nirmala Sitharaman, Thawar Chand Gehlot, Piyush Goyal, Mukhtar Abbas Naqvi, Shivraj Singh Chouhan, Sushil Modi, Keshav Prasad Maurya and Meenakshi Lekhi. The inputs for manifesto were taken by crowd sourcing wherein around 7,500 suggestion boxes were placed in 4,000 assembly constituencies and ferried in 300 buses or raths.

Jammu and Kashmir
The BJP in April announced if it were to be reelected, then it would be ending Jammu and Kashmir's special constitutional status, which prevents non-residents from buying property in Indian State of Jammu and Kashmir.

Parliamentary candidates

References

External links
 

2019 Indian general election
2019
Indian general election campaigns